Millville Public Schools is a school district that serves students in pre-kindergarten-twelfth grade from the city of Millville, in Cumberland County, New Jersey, United States. The district is one of 31 former Abbott districts statewide that were established pursuant to the decision by the New Jersey Supreme Court in Abbott v. Burke which are now referred to as "SDA Districts" based on the requirement for the state to cover all costs for school building and renovation projects in these districts under the supervision of the New Jersey Schools Development Authority.

As of the 2018–19 school year, the district, comprised of nine schools, had an enrollment of 5,540 students and 420.0 classroom teachers (on an FTE basis), for a student–teacher ratio of 13.2:1.

The district is classified by the New Jersey Department of Education as being in District Factor Group "A", the lowest of eight groupings. District Factor Groups organize districts statewide to allow comparison by common socioeconomic characteristics of the local districts. From the lowest socioeconomic status to highest, the categories are A, B, CD, DE, FG, GH, I and J.

The district has high school sending/receiving relationships with Commercial Township, Lawrence Township and Maurice River Township. Students from Woodbine had attended the district's high school programs until a July 2013 ruling by the New Jersey Department of Transportation under which Woodbine students would start attending Middle Township High School as of September 2014, while Woodbine students who had already started attendance in Millville would be allowed to graduate.

History

In 2013 Woodbine School District chose to change its receiving high school district from Millville district to Middle Township School District, which meant it would begin sending high school students to Middle Township High School instead of the Millville high schools. Lynda Anderson-Towns, superintendent of the Woodbine district, cited the closer proximity and smaller size of Middle Township High.

As part of a project $137 million project begun in 2019 and funded by the New Jersey Schools Development Authority, Millville Senior High School has undergone a project that will add  of space, which will allow all high school students to attend high school in a single building; when complete, the phased high school expansion project will add  of new space at the high school, as well as extensive renovations to existing facilities in the building. Starting in the 1960s, grades 9-10 have been served in Memorial High School and grades 9-12 at Millville Senior High School.

Schools
Schools in the district (with 2018–19 enrollment data from the National Center for Education Statistics) are:

Preschool
Child Family Center with 614 students in PreK
JoAnn Burns, Principal

Primary schools
R. M. Bacon Elementary School with 296 students in grades K-5
Dr Spike Cook, Principal
Holly Heights Elementary School with 500 students in grades K-5
Stephen Saul, Principal
Mt. Pleasant Elementary School with 242 students in grades K-5
Harry Drew, Principal
Rieck Avenue Elementary School with 470 students in grades K-5
Mike Coyle, Principal
Silver Run Elementary School with 518 students in grades K-5
Eric Reissek, Principal

Middle schools
Lakeside Middle School with 1,074 students in grades 6-8
Amanda Gauntt, Principal

High schools
Memorial High School with 807 students in grades 9-10
Jamie Sutton, Principal
Millville Senior High School with 887 students in grades 11-12

Alternative school
Thunderbolt Academy is a partnership between Millville Public Schools and Camelot Education. Camelot offers an alternative setting for students facing behavioral, emotional or academic challenges.
At one time it used leased space at the ex-St. Mary Magdalen Regional School building, but in 2017 the district announced it would move it into the former Wood elementary building, which meant the district would spend $50,000 fewer each year.

Former schools
R. D. Wood Elementary School, which opened in 1915 and therefore at the time was the oldest school in the district, was closed at the end of the 2017-18 school year. The closure was estimated to result in savings of $1.8 million annually.

Administration
Core members of the district's administration are:
Tony Trongone, Superintendent
Richard Davidson, Business Administrator / Board Secretary

Board of education
The district's board of education, comprised of nine members, sets policy and oversees the fiscal and educational operation of the district through its administration. As a Type II school district, the board's trustees are elected directly by voters to serve three-year terms of office on a staggered basis, with three seats up for election each year held (since 2012) as part of the November general election. The board appoints a superintendent to oversee the district's day-to-day operations and a business administrator to supervise the business functions of the district.

Student body

In 2008 the district had about 6,400 students, including 60 high school students from Woodbine. In 2013 the district had a total of 1,900 students at the high school level, with its high school facilities being overcrowded.

References

External links 
Millville Public Schools

School Data for the Millville Public Schools, National Center for Education Statistics

Millville, New Jersey
New Jersey Abbott Districts
New Jersey District Factor Group A
School districts in Cumberland County, New Jersey